Sagesse Sports Club, known as Hekmeh in Arabic, is a football club based in Achrafieh, a district in Beirut, Lebanon, that competes in the .

The club was founded in 1943 as Cercle de la Sagesse. Although they haven't won any major title, Sagesse came second twice in the Lebanese Premier League 2002, and were finalists in both the Lebanese FA Cup, in 2006, and the Lebanese Federation Cup, in 2004. The club is mostly known for its basketball program, and mainly has Maronite Christian ties.

History

Early history 
The Collège de la Sagesse school had a football club with their own students; at the end of each season, graduated players would go on to play for other senior teams, mainly Salam Achrafieh.

Sagesse's senior team were formed in 1942 under the patronage of Father Boulos Kik, the general director of the Sagesse Institute, supported by Monseigneur Jean Maroun. The club received their official license on 14 October 1943, and were formed as Cercle de la Sagesse by a group of former students, namely Edward Tyan, Camille Cordahi, Elie Khalife, and Negib Hobeika. Toutoungi was the club's first president.

The team first played in the 1943–44 Lebanese Second Division; initially formed of former students, the club later also accepted other players. They won the Second Division in their first season, and were due to be promoted to the Lebanese Premier League after beating Shabiba Mazraa 4–0 in the promotion play-offs. However, due to a technicality, Sagesse were allocated in the Second Division for the 1944–45 season. From the 1945–46 season, the club were known as Club de la Sagesse.

Recent history 
In 2006 Sagesse reached the final of the Lebanese FA Cup, but lost against the cup holder Ansar 3–1. Sagesse finished second in the 2020–21 Lebanese Second Division, and were promoted back to the Lebanese Premier League after five years.

Club rivalries 
Sagesse plays the Achrafieh derby with Racing Beirut.

Players

Current squad

Notable players

Honours
Lebanese Second Division
 Winners (4): 1943–44, 1947–48, 1955–56, 1998–99
 Lebanese Premier League
 Runners-up (1): 2001–02
 Lebanese FA Cup
 Runners-up (1): 2005–06
 Lebanese Federation Cup
 Runners-up (1): 2004

Managerial history

 Eugen Moldovan (2000–2001)
 Theo Bücker (2001–2002)
 Emile Rustom (2005)
 Riad Murad
 Fouad Hijazi
 Fouad Leila
 Sohad Zahran (–2021)
 Vardan Ghazaryan (2021–2022)
 Emile Rustom (2022–present)

See also 
 Sagesse SC
 Sagesse SC (basketball)
 List of football clubs in Lebanon

References

External links
 

Sagesse SC
1943 establishments in Lebanon
Football clubs in Lebanon
Association football clubs established in 1943